Jurang Pemisah is the debut studio album by Indonesian singer Chrisye. It was produced and released by Pramaqua Records.

Background
After the success of Guruh Gipsy and "Lilin-Lilin Kecil", Chrisye was approached by Pramaqua records in 1977. They offered him a chance to record his first studio album. Working with Yockie Suryoprayogo, he recorded Jurang Pemisah. Chrisye performed the vocals on seven songs and played the bass, Jockie played the keyboard, guitar, and drums, and provided vocals on three. Ian Antono and Teddy Sujaya played the guitar and drums respectively for the songs "Mesin Kota" and "Dia" ("").

According to Yockie, Jurang Pemisah was "a portrait of social reality", dealing with themes such as the environment and politics. The eponymous song, for example, was about class discrimination causing a divide between the different social strata. Another, "Jeritan Sebrang" was considered a portrait of supporters of the Republic of South Maluku. Yockie took inspiration from and blended elements of Rick Wakeman and Jon Lord to create and arrange the album.

The album was released that same year with "high hopes", with the songs "Jurang Pemisah" and "Jeritan Seberang" planned to become singles. However, sales were lackluster. In his biography, Chrisye commented that Jurang Pemisah sold "like chicken shit"; warm at the beginning, but cooling off quickly.
It did not receive any critical praise upon release.

Track listing

Notes

References

1977 debut albums
Indonesian-language albums
Chrisye albums